Stuart Scott Bullock is an American voice actor best known for voicing various characters on Danny Phantom (2004-2007).

Career
Bullock is known for providing voices for characters, such as Eddy in the Barnyard franchise, Glow Worm in The Ant Bully, King Goobot in The Adventures of Jimmy Neutron: Boy Genius (replacing Patrick Stewart), Thunder in Teen Titans, Captain Bones and Lens McCracken in Crashbox, Lamont in Gargoyles, Flappy Bob from The Fairly Odd Parents: School's Out!, Primarch Galenth Dysley / Barthandelus in Final Fantasy XIII, and Hades in Kid Icarus: Uprising.

He also supplied the voice of Mr. Elliot in Invader Zim, Dash Baxter in Danny Phantom (2004-2007), Argos Bleak in The New Adventures of Captain Planet, Flapper in Dink, the Little Dinosaur, and Dr. Damage and Emperor Bog in Butt-Ugly Martians. Bullock also appeared on camera in films and shows, such as Defending Your Life as Daniel's father, Murder, She Wrote as a taxi driver, and Life Stinks as an outraged party guest.

Filmography

Film

 Afro Samurai: Resurrection - Professor Dharman, Kidnapper
 Barnyard: The Original Party Animals - Eddy
 Defending Your Life - Daniel's father
 Jimmy Neutron's Nicktoon Blast - King Goobot V, Elvis Ooblar
 Life Stinks - Outraged Party Guest
 The Ant Bully - Glow Worm

Television
 Afro Samurai - Dharman
 All Grown Up! - Pool Manager, Worker, Scary Voice (Ep. The Curse of Reptar)
 As Told by Ginger - Dr. Randall, Narrator (2 episodes)
 Attack of the Killer Tomatoes: The Animated Series - F. T.
 Back at the Barnyard - Eddy, Additional voices
 Barnyard Commandos - Eddy
 Bonkers - Skunky Skunk, Mr. Big, Toon Pencil
 Breadwinners - T-Midi, Salvation Army Duck
 Butt-Ugly Martians - Dr. Damage, Emperor Bog
 The New Adventures Of Captain Planet - Argos Bleak
 Clarence - Pete, Xavius, Terry Coogan, Additional voices
 Crashbox - Captain Bones / Lens McCracken
 Danny Phantom - Dash Baxter, Klemper, Cujo the Ghost Dog, Walker's Goons, Additional voices
 Dink, the Little Dinosaur - Flapper
 Duck Dodgers - Additional voices
 Fish Hooks - Ice Pick
 Frankenthumb - Dr. Frankenthumb, Mayor, Minister
 Invader Zim - Mr. Elliot, Additional voices
 Mighty Ducks: The Animated Series - Young Grin
 Soul Quest Overdrive - Injured Man
 Super Robot Monkey Team Hyperforce Go! - Super Computer
 Jason and the Heroes of Mount Olympus - Mercury
 Mike & Molly - TV Announcer #1
 Quack Pack - Doug Slackwell 
 Mike Lu and Og - Wendell, Baggis Cuzzlewit
 My Life as a Teenage Robot - Jean-Phillippe, Additional voices
 Phineas and Ferb - Additional voices
 Random! Cartoons - Additional voices
 Regular Show - Giant Coffee Bean, Additional voices
 Rugrats - Pirates, Additional Voices
 Shaggy & Scooby-Doo Get a Clue! - Chef Francoise, Kevin, Informercial Guy
 Yo, Yogi! - Additional voices
 Stroker and Hoop - Hoop's Mom, Rose Schwartz, Additional voices
 Tak and the Power of Juju - Psychic Juju
 TaleSpin - Ignatz
 Teen Titans - Thunder
 The Buzz on Maggie - Larry, Snap Carpenter, Additional voices
 The Emperor's New School - Additional voices
 The Fairly OddParents - Flappy Bob, Additional voices
 The Adventures of Jimmy Neutron: Boy Genius - King Goobot V
 The Legend of Korra - Two Toed Ping
 The Life and Times of Juniper Lee - Additional voices
 The Lion King's Timon & Pumbaa - Fred
 Goof Troop - Pharaoh Gang Member, Tooth
 Darkwing Duck - Tom Lockjaw
 The Marvelous Misadventures of Flapjack - Captain Ridiculous, Captain Handy, Lord Nickelbottoms, Additional voices
 The Powerpuff Girls - Additional voices
 2016 - Additional voices
 The Super Hero Squad Show - Red King, Unseen Announcer
 Tom and Jerry Works - Muscle Mouse
 Zazoo U - Slogo Bonito
 Zoomates - Paul

Video games
 Afro Samurai - Dharman, Assassin
 A Series of Unfortunate Events - Bald-Headed Man With the Long Nose
 Buzz Lightyear of Star Command - Warp Darkmatter
 Cars Race-O-Rama - Bubba
 Destroy All Humans! series
 Big Willy Unleashed - Additional voices
 Path of the Furon - Vinnie Molinari, Producer
 EverQuest II - Captain Hastings, Additional voices
 Escape from Monkey Island - Otis
 Final Fantasy series
 X-2 - Logos
 XIII - Galenth Dysley, Barthandelus, Orphan
 XIII-2 - Additional voices
 Full Throttle - Grand Marnier
 God Hand - Mad Midget Five, Psychic Midget, Villains
 Ground Control II: Operation Exodus - Centurion Dracus
 Kid Icarus: Uprising - Hades
 King's Quest: Mask of Eternity - Connor, King Mudge
 Lego Dimensions - Sloth
 MadWorld - President, Yee Fung, Little Eddie
 Mass Effect - Commander Rentola, Ian Newstead
 Metal Gear Solid: The Twin Snakes - Genome Soldier
 Neverwinter Nights 2: Mask of the Betrayer - Myrkul, One of Many (God), Master Geb
 Nicktoons: Globs of Doom - Ghost Dog, Dash Baxter
 SpongeBob's Atlantis SquarePantis - Additional Voices
 SWAT 4, including The Stetchkov Syndicate - Steven "Gramps" Reynolds (Badge #3077)
 The Bard's Tale - Additional voices
 The Incredible Hulk - Vector
 The Incredible Hulk: Ultimate Destruction - Vector
 The Curse of Monkey Island - Lemonhead, Pirate #2
 The Punisher - Crack Dealer, Chop Shop Worker
 The Secret of Monkey Island: Special Edition - Red Skull, Otis
 The Sopranos: Road to Respect - Additional voices
 The SpongeBob SquarePants Movie video game  - Additional Voices
 The Suffering: Ties That Bind - The Creeper
 Valkyria Chronicles II - Jarde
 World in Conflict - Additional voices

References

External links
 Official website
 
 

Living people
American male film actors
American male television actors
American male video game actors
American male voice actors
20th-century American male actors
21st-century American male actors
Year of birth missing (living people)